Charles Gheerbrant (13 September 1924 – 23 April 2019) was a French politician who served as a National Assembly Deputy (1993–1997) and as Mayor of Saint-Nicolas (1973–2001).

References

1924 births
2019 deaths
Union for French Democracy politicians
Deputies of the 10th National Assembly of the French Fifth Republic
Mayors of places in Hauts-de-France
20th-century French politicians
21st-century French politicians